The 1990 NCAA Division II women's basketball tournament was the ninth annual tournament hosted by the NCAA to determine the national champion of Division II women's  collegiate basketball in the United States.

Defending champions Delta State defeated Bentley in the championship game, 77–43, claiming the Lady Statesmen's second NCAA Division II national title. 

The championship rounds were contested in Pomona, California.

Regionals

New England - Waltham, Massachusetts
Location: Dana Center Host: Bentley College

South Atlantic - Louisville, Kentucky
Location: Knights Hall Host: Bellarmine College

South Central - Warrensburg, Missouri
Location: CMSU Fieldhouse Host: Central Missouri State University

Great Lakes - Rochester, Michigan
Location: Lepley Sports Center Host: Oakland University

East - Edinboro, Pennsylvania
Location: McComb Fieldhouse Host: Edinboro State College of Pennsylvania

South - Cleveland, Mississippi
Location: Walter Sillers Coliseum Host: Delta State University

North Central - Grand Forks, North Dakota
Location: Hyslop Sports Center Host: University of North Dakota

West - Davis, California
Location: Recreation Hall Host: University of California, Davis

National Finals - Pomona, California
Final Four Location: Kellogg Gym Host: California State Polytechnic University, Pomona

All-tournament team
 Crystal Hardy, Delta State
 Pam Lockett, Delta State
 Tracie Seymour, Bentley
 Niki Bracken, Cal Poly Pomona
 Debbie Delie, Oakland

See also
 1990 NCAA Division I women's basketball tournament
 1990 NCAA Division III women's basketball tournament
 1990 NCAA Division II men's basketball tournament
1990 NAIA women's basketball tournament

References
 1990 NCAA Division II women's basketball tournament jonfmorse.com

 
NCAA Division II women's basketball tournament
1990 in sports in California